Agnieszka Radwańska was the defending champion, but lost in the quarterfinals to Petra Kvitová.  Kvitová went on to win the title, defeating Sara Errani in the final, 6–2, 1–6, 6–1.

Seeds
The top four seeds receive a bye into the second round.

Draw

Finals

Top half

Bottom half

Qualifying

Seeds

Qualifiers

Lucky loser
  Carla Suárez Navarro

Draw

First qualifier

Second qualifier

Third qualifier

Fourth qualifier

External links
 WTA tournament draws

Dubai Tennis Championships - Singles
2013 Singles